Soaring Through a Dream is an album by jazz guitarist Al Di Meola that was released in 1985.

Track listing
"Capoeira" (Al Di Meola, Airto Moreira)  – 9:21 
"Traces (Of A Tear)" (Di Meola) – 9:00
"Broken Heart" (Di Meola) – 5:00
"July" (Di Meola) – 5:25
"Marina" (Di Meola, Moreira) – 4:45
"Soaring Through A Dream" (Di Meola, Moreira) – 12:26

Personnel
 Al Di Meola – acoustic and synclavier guitars
 Phil Markowitz – keyboards
 Chip Jackson – bass guitar
 Danny Gottlieb – drums
 Airto Moreira – percussion, vocals

Chart performance

References

1985 albums
Al Di Meola albums
Manhattan Records albums